Khawarnaq was a medieval castle constructed by the Arab Lakhmids near their capital of al-Hira. The castle is mentioned in both Arabic and Persian sources, albeit it is difficult to determine what information is historical and what is myth.

References

Sources

Further reading 
 
 

Lakhmids
Castles in Iraq